Greifenhagen is a village and a former municipality in the Mansfeld-Südharz district, Saxony-Anhalt, Germany. Since 1 January 2010, it has been part of the town of Arnstein.

References

Former municipalities in Saxony-Anhalt
Arnstein, Saxony-Anhalt